Edward Charles Hakewill (1816–1872) was an English church architect, the son of Henry Hakewill and Anne Sarah Frith. His brother, John Henry Hakewill (1810–1880), was also an architect.

Career
Hakewill designed the church of St John of Jerusalem, South Hackney (1845–8), St James's, Clapton, and St Peter's, Thurston, Suffolk. Towards the end of his career he restored St Mary & St Lambert, Stonham Aspal, and churches at Grundisburgh and Wickham Market.

Selected publications
The Temple: an Essay on the Ark, the Tabernacle, and the Temple of Jerusalem. 1851

References

External links

Suffolk Churches
Suffolk Churches

1812 births
1872 deaths
Fellows of the Royal Institute of British Architects
19th-century English architects